Matías Nicolás Del Priore (born 14 August 1996) is an Argentine professional footballer who plays as a midfielder for Deportivo Maipú.

Career
Del Priore started in the ranks of Independiente. In July 2018, Del Priore was loaned out to Primera B Nacional side Defensores de Belgrano. Having been an unused substitute six times in all competitions, he made his professional debut on 3 November during a 1–1 draw with Independiente Rivadavia. Seventeen further appearances arrived in 2018–19. Del Priore spent the subsequent 2019–20 campaign on loan with Villa Dálmine. He featured eighteen times and scored once; netting in his final match on 1 March 2020 in a defeat away from home versus Gimnasia y Esgrima.

On 3 November 2020, Del Priore was loaned out for a third time as he agreed a six-month deal with Primera B de Chile team Deportes Santa Cruz. His debut arrived a day later during a home win over Unión San Felipe. However, the spell was cut short and he was recalled at the end of January 2021. Following the spell in Chile, he had to loan spells at Estudiantes de Buenos Aires and Almirante Brown in 2021.

In February 2022, Del Priore joined Primera Nacional side Deportivo Maipú on a three-year deal.

Career statistics
.

References

External links

1996 births
Living people
People from Lomas de Zamora
Argentine footballers
Argentine expatriate footballers
Association football midfielders
Primera Nacional players
Primera B de Chile players
Club Atlético Independiente footballers
Defensores de Belgrano footballers
Villa Dálmine footballers
Deportes Santa Cruz footballers
Estudiantes de Buenos Aires footballers
Club Almirante Brown footballers
Deportivo Maipú players
Liga II players
FC Politehnica Iași (2010) players
Expatriate footballers in Chile
Argentine expatriate sportspeople in Chile
Expatriate footballers in Romania
Argentine expatriate sportspeople in Romania
Sportspeople from Buenos Aires Province